Numidocapra is an extinct genus of bovid from the Pleistocene of Africa.

Taxonomy
Originally placed in the subfamily caprinae, Numidocapra is now generally classified as a member of the subfamily Alcelaphinae. Three species are considered valid. Numidocapra arambourgi was originally placed in its own genus, Rabaticeras. It was at one point considered an ancestor of the hartebeest, but this is not considered likely anymore. Another species, N. porrocornutus, was previously placed in Damaliscus.

Description
These bovids had narrow, tall skulls typical of alcelaphines. The braincase roof is sloping with a straight profile. Their horns were curved upwards and forwards at side view, with frontals slightly raised at the horn bases. Numidocapra crassicornis was the largest member of the genus, probably around the size of a wildebeest. It had long, upright horn cores that ran parallel to each other, while Numidocapra arambourgi was smaller and had diverging, twisted horns.

References

Prehistoric bovids
Pleistocene even-toed ungulates
Pleistocene mammals of Africa
Prehistoric mammal genera